Nalco Champion supplies fine chemicals and related services to all areas of the petroleum industry. It has corporate offices in Houston and Sugar Land, Texas. It is a subsidiary of Ecolab.

History
The company was formed following the acquisition of Champion Technologies by Ecolab, the parent company of Nalco Holding Company, on April 10, 2013.

In December 2013, the company announced plans to construct a new facility in Sugar Land.

In 2018, the company opened a plant in Argentina.

In 2020, completed the merge with Apergy create the new company ChampionX, as a result of the SpinOff with Ecolab.

See also
 List of oilfield service companies

References

External links
 

2013 establishments in Texas
Companies based in Sugar Land, Texas
Specialty chemical companies